Jóźwik is a Polish surname.

Notable people with the surname include:

Joanna Jóźwik (born 1991), Polish runner
Marek Jóźwik (born 1947), Polish hurdler
Urszula Jóźwik (born 1947), Polish sprinter
Death of Arkadiusz Jóźwik, 2016 crime in England

Polish-language surnames